Ustyugov is a Russian masculine surname, its feminine counterpart is Ustyugova. Notable people with the surname include:

Evgeny Ustyugov (born 1985), Russian biathlete
Sergey Ustiugov (born 1992), Russian cross-country skier

Russian-language surnames